Ray is an unincorporated community in southeastern Harrison Township, Vinton County, Ohio, United States.  It has a post office with the ZIP code 45672.  It is located along State Route 327 in western Vinton County.

History
Ray was originally called Raysville, and under the latter name was platted in 1853 by Moses Ray, and named for his family. Another former variant name was Rays. A post office was established under the name Rays in 1856, and the name was changed to Ray in 1893.

References

Unincorporated communities in Ohio
Unincorporated communities in Vinton County, Ohio